"The Long Run" is a song written by Don Henley and Glenn Frey and recorded by the Eagles. The sound of the song is viewed as a tribute to the Stax / Memphis rhythm and blues sound. It was the title track of their album The Long Run and was released as a single in November 1979. It reached No. 8 on the U.S. Billboard Hot 100 in early 1980. It was the second of three singles released from The Long Run album, preceded by "Heartache Tonight," which reached No. 1 on the Billboard Hot 100 in November 1979, and followed by "I Can't Tell You Why," which also reached No. 8  on the Billboard Hot 100, in the spring of 1980.

Composition
According to Don Henley, "The Long Run" was written in part as a response to press articles that said the Eagles were "passé" as disco was then dominant and punk emerging, inspiring lines such as "Who is gonna make it/ We'll find out in the long run". He also said that irony was part of the inspiration, as the song is about longevity and posterity while the group "was breaking apart, imploding under the pressure of trying to deliver a worthy follow-up to Hotel California".

Reception
Billboard describes "the Long Run" as "a midtempo rocker with a rather straightforward rhythmic delivery and a catchy lyrical hook towards the end."  Billboard also praised the "tight, well crafted orchestration.  Cash Box said that the song is an "upbeat cut" but that "Don Henley's raspy vocals suggest subtle tension with the theme of survival."  Record World praised "Henley's affecting vocals."  In his book The Heart of Rock & Soul: The 1001 Greatest Singles Ever Made, music critic Dave Marsh called the song a complete ripoff of the 1972 R&B record "Tryin' to Live My Life Without You".

Personnel
Don Henley: lead vocals, drums
Glenn Frey: rhythm guitar, backing vocals
Joe Walsh: slide guitar, backing vocals
Don Felder: slide guitar, Hammond organ, backing vocals
Timothy B. Schmit: bass guitar, backing vocals
Joe Vitale: electric piano

Chart performance

Weekly charts

Year-end charts

Cover versions
 American band Reel Big Fish recorded their own rendition of the song for their 2009 album Fame, Fortune and Fornication.

Popular culture
The song was featured on the TV show WKRP in Cincinnati on the episode "The Doctor's Daughter". Specifically, Dr. Johnny Fever decides to air the recording and his programming director Andy Travis is hysterical with delight that his popular DJ is playing a then-hit record for once.

References

1979 singles
Eagles (band) songs
Songs written by Glenn Frey
Songs written by Don Henley
Asylum Records singles
Song recordings produced by Bill Szymczyk
1979 songs